The Monteath Hills are a group of mountains in the Victory Mountains of Victoria Land, Antarctica, bounded by Jutland Glacier, Midway Glacier, Pearl Harbor Glacier, and Plata Glacier. The group includes Mount Crowder, Mount Tararua ( high), and Mount Holdsworth. The hills were named by the New Zealand Antarctic Place-Names Committee in 1983, after Colin Monteath, a field operations officer with the Antarctic Division of the New Zealand Department of Scientific and Industrial Research.

References

Mountains of Victoria Land
Borchgrevink Coast